Langar Barani (also Romanized as Langar Bārānī; also known as Bārānī and Langar) is a village in Qorqori Rural District, Qorqori District, Hirmand County, Sistan and Baluchestan Province, Iran. At the 2006 census, its population was 388, in 75 families.

References 

Populated places in Hirmand County